The kip (code: LAK; sign: ₭ or ₭N; ; officially: ເງີນກີບລາວ, lit. "currency Lao kip") is the currency of Laos since 1955. Historically, one kip was divided into 100 att.

The term derives from ກີບ kì:p, a Lao word meaning "ingot."

History

French Indochina

The piastre was the currency of French Indochina between 1885 and 1952.

Free Lao Kip (1946)
In 1945–1946, the Free Lao government in Vientiane issued a series of paper money in denominations of 10, 20 and 50 att and 100 kip before the French authorities took control of the region.

Royal Kip (1955)
The kip was reintroduced in 1955, replacing the French Indochinese piastre at par. The kip (also called a piastre in French) was sub-divided into 100 att (Lao: ອັດ) or cents (French: Centimes). It was pegged to the French franc at a rate of 10 francs per kip.

On 10 October 1958, the kip's peg switched to the US dollar, and was officially devalued from ₭35 to ₭80 per US dollar: however, the official exchange rate did not reflect market conditions at the time, with the parallel rate reaching ₭600 per dollar by the end of 1963. Laos devalued the kip again on 1 January 1964, and adopted an official rate of ₭240 per dollar and a "free market" rate of about ₭505 per dollar: the free market rate then fell to ₭600 per dollar on 8 November 1971, with the official rate being abolished on 4 April 1972.

Pathet Lao Kip (1976) 
The Pathet Lao introduced the liberation kip on 12 October 1968, for circulation in the areas that the group controlled.  Banknotes for the liberation kip, which were printed in China, consisted of ₭1, ₭10, ₭20, ₭50, ₭100, ₭200 and ₭500.

According to the Pathet Lao's media outlet Siang Pasason, one liberation kip was worth 6 royal kip on 20 August 1975, three days before the Pathet Lao entered Vientiane. Based on historic exchange rates provided by the International Monetary Fund, one US dollar in 1975 was worth 725 royal kip or 120.83 liberation kip.

In 1976, the new communist Laotian government replaced the royal kip with the liberation kip. The exchange rate was 20 royal kip per liberation kip. A currency confiscation was carried out, where individuals could exchange up to 100,000 royal kip for liberation kip, and businesses up to one million royal kip: they had to deposit the rest in a bank.

Lao PDR Kip (1979) 
On 16 December 1979, the former Pathet Lao “Liberation” kip was replaced by the new Lao kip at a rate of 100 to 1.

Coins 
Royal Kip (1955)

Coins were issued in denominations of 10, 20 and 50 att or cents with French and Lao inscriptions. All were struck in aluminum and had a hole in the centre, like the Chinese cash coins. The only year of issue was 1952.

Pathet Lao Kip (1976)

Coins 
Coins were again issued in Laos for the first time in 28 years in 1980 with denominations of 10, 20 and 50 att, with each being struck in aluminum and depicting the state emblem on the obverse and agricultural themes on the reverse. These were followed by commemorative 1, 5, 10, 20 and 50 kip coins issued in 1985 for the 10th anniversary of the establishment of the Lao People's Democratic Republic. However, due to the economic toll of the Soviet collapse in 1991 and the persistence of chronic inflation, coins are rarely seen in circulation.

Banknotes 

In 1953, the Laos branch of the Institut d'Emission des États du Cambodge, du Laos et du Vietnam issued notes dual denominated in piastre and kip. At the same time, the two other branches had similar arrangements with the riel in Cambodia and the đồng in South Vietnam. There were notes for 1, 5, 10 and 100 kip/piastres.

In 1957, the government issued notes denominated solely in kip. The notes were for 1, 5, 10, 20 and 50 kip printed by the Security Banknote Company, 100 kip printed by the Banque de France and a commemorative 500 kip printed by De La Rue. 1 and 5 kip notes printed by Bradbury & Wilkinson, as well as 10 kip notes by De La Rue were introduced in 1962.

In 1963, 20, 50, 200 and 1000 kip notes were added, all printed by De La Rue. These were followed by 100, 500 and 5000 kip notes in 1974–75, again by De La Rue. 10 kip notes by Bradbury & Wilkinson and 1000 kip notes by De La Rue were printed but not circulated.

Pathet Lao Kip (1976) 
Banknotes issued in 1975 or before in Pathet Lao controlled areas, and were in denominations of 1, 10, 20, 50, 100, 200 and 500 kip.

Lao PDR Kip (1979)
In 1979, banknotes were introduced in denominations of 1, 5, 10, 20, 50 and 100 kip. 500 kip notes were added in 1988, followed by 1000 kip in 1992, 2000 and 5000 kip in 1997, 10,000 and 20,000 kip in 2002 and 50,000 kip on January 17, 2006 (although dated 2004). On November 15, 2010, a 100,000 kip banknote was issued to commemorate the 450th anniversary of the founding of the capital, Vientiane, and the 35th anniversary of the establishment of the Lao People's Democratic Republic. Kaysone Phomvihane (1920–1992) is pictured on the obverse of the 2,000, 5,000, 10,000, 20,000, 50,000, and 100,000 kip banknotes.

The Bank of Laos governor announced on January 25, 2012, that the Bank of Laos would issue 100,000 Kip banknotes as a regular issue on February 1, 2012 (but dated 2011) to encourage Lao people to use the national currency instead of U.S. dollars and Thai baht.
As of 2019, the ₭500 note is the smallest one commonly in circulation.

Lao kip exchange rate

References

Economy of Laos
Currency symbols
Currencies of Laos
Currencies introduced in 1952